Kleiner Semmering Pass (el. 463 m.) is a low mountain pass in the Wienerwald in the Bundesland of Lower Austria.

It forms the divide between the watersheds of the Vienna River and the Liesingbach.

See also
 List of highest paved roads in Europe
 List of mountain passes

Mountain passes of the Alps
Mountain passes of Lower Austria